Valdemar Rudolph von Raasløff (6 November 1815  – 14 February 1883) was a Danish politician, military officer and diplomat.

Biography
Raasløff was born at Altona in the Duchy of Holstein. He spent his school years at Sorø and in 1832 he was admitted to the Royal Military College (Kgl. Militære Højskole), from which he graduated in 1838 as second lieutenant in the artillery.

Instead of serving in Denmark, he applied for service abroad and in 1840–41 he served in the French Army in Algeria. He later summarized his experiences in Algeria in a book, which was translated into several languages. In 1849–50, he served as captain in the Danish army in the First War of Schleswig, however, in 1851, he left the military in order to go to America and become an engineer.

In 1857, he was appointed Denmark's Minister Resident in Washington, DC. On behalf of King Christian IX, he concluded the first commercial treaty between Denmark and the Qing Empire on 13 July 1863, a treaty which was modeled on the Treaties of Tianjin and governed the relationship between the two countries for several decades. Between 1 October 1866 and 19 April 1870, he served as the War Minister of Denmark. He died during 1883 in Paris.

References

Other sources
 Raaslöff, Waldemar Rudolph von. Rückblick auf die militarischen und politischen Verhältnisse der Algérie in den Jahren 1840 und 1841. Altona, J. F. Hammerich, 1845.
 Svend Dahl og P. Engelstoft, eds. Dansk biografisk haandleksikon. Kjøbenhavn og Kristiania, Glydendal, Nordisk forlag, 1920–26.

External links
Biographic entry from Nordisk familjebok (in Swedish)

19th-century Danish diplomats
Danish Defence Ministers
Danish military personnel
1815 births
1883 deaths
People from Altona, Hamburg